Attis (also ,) was the consort of Cybele, in Phrygian and Greek mythology.

His priests were eunuchs, the Galli, as explained by origin myths pertaining to Attis castrating himself. Attis was also a Phrygian vegetation deity. His self-mutilation, death, and resurrection represents the fruits of the earth, which die in winter only to rise again in the spring.

According to Ovid's Metamorphoses, Attis transformed himself into a pine tree.

No connection to the god Atys
Nineteenth century scholarship wrongly identified the god Attis with the similar-sounding name of the god Atys. The name "Atys" is often seen in ancient Aegean cultures; it was mentioned by Herodotus,
however Herodotus was describing Atys, the son of Croesus, a human in a historical account. The 19th century conflation of the man Atys's name with the mythology of the god he was presumably named after, "Atys the sun god, slain by the boar's tusk of winter", and hence a connection to similar-sounding Attis was a mistake, but the long-standing error is still found in modern sources.

History
An Attis cult began around 1250 BCE in Dindymon (today's Murat Dağı of Gediz, Kütahya, Turkey). He was originally a local semi-deity of Phrygia, associated with the great Phrygian trading city of Pessinos, which lay under the lee of Mount Agdistis. The mountain was personified as a daemon, whom foreigners associated with the Great Mother Cybele.

In the late 4th century BCE, a cult of Attis became a feature of the Greek world. The story of his origins at Agdistis, recorded by the traveller Pausanias, have some distinctly non-Greek elements.

Pausanias was told that the daemon Agdistis initially bore both male and female sexual organs. The Olympian gods feared Agdistis and they conspired to cause Agditis to accidentally castrate themself. Blood from the wounded Agdistis spilled onto the soil and from this an almond tree grew. Later, Nana, a daughter of the river-god Sangarius, picked an almond from this tree and laid it in her bosom. The almond disappeared and she found herself pregnant before eventually giving birth to and abandoning the infant Attis.

The infant was tended by a he-goat. As Attis grew, his long-haired beauty was godlike, and his parent, Agdistis (as Cybele) then fell in love with him. But Attis' foster parents sent him to Pessinos, where he was to wed the king's daughter.

According to some versions the King of Pessinos was Midas. Just as the marriage-song was being sung, Agdistis / Cybele appeared in her transcendent power, and Attis went mad and castrated himself under a pine. When he died, violets grew from his blood. Attis' father-in-law-to-be, the king who was giving his daughter in marriage, followed suit, prefiguring the self-castrating corybantes who devoted themselves to Cybele. Agdistis asked Zeus to bring the young man back to life, but Zeus could only make sure that his body did not decompose, his hair continued to grow, and he moved his little finger .

At the temple of Cybele in Pessinus, the mother of the gods was still called Agdistis, the geographer Strabo recounted.

As neighbouring Lydia came to control Phrygia, the cult of Attis was given a Lydian context too. Attis is said to have introduced to Lydia the cult of the Mother Goddess Cybele, incurring the jealousy of Zeus, who sent a boar to destroy the Lydian crops. Then certain Lydians, with Attis himself, were killed by the boar. Pausanias adds, to corroborate this story, that the Gauls who inhabited Pessinos abstained from pork. This myth element may have been invented solely to explain the unusual dietary laws of the Lydian Gauls. In Rome, the eunuch followers of Cybele were called galli.

 Julian describes the orgiastic cult of Cybele and its spread.
It began in Anatolia and was adopted in Greece, and eventually Republican Rome; the cult of Attis, her reborn eunuch consort, accompanied her.

Literature 
The first literary reference to Attis is the subject of one of the most famous poems by Catullus,
apparently before Attis had begun to be worshipped in Rome, as Attis' worship began in the early Empire. 

In 1675, Jean-Baptiste Lully, who was attached to Louis XIV's court, composed an opera titled Atys. In 1780, Niccolo Piccinni composed his own Atys.

Oscar Wilde mentions Attis' self-mutilation in his poem The Sphinx, published in 1894:
"And Atys with his blood-stained knife
 were better than the thing I am."

Philosophy 
Emperor Julian's "Hymn to the Mother of Gods" contains a detailed Neoplatonic analysis of Attis. In that work Julian says: "Of him [Attis] the myth relates that, after being exposed at birth near the eddying stream of the river Gallus, he grew up like a flower, and when he had grown to be fair and tall, he was beloved by the Mother of the Gods. And she entrusted all things to him, and moreover set on his head the starry cap." On this passage, the scholiast (Wright) says: "The whole passage implies the identification of Attis with nature...cf. 162A where Attis is called 'Nature,' φύσις."

Archaeological finds 
The most important representation of Attis is the lifesize statue discovered at Ostia Antica, near the mouth of Rome's river. The statue is of a reclining Attis, after the emasculation. In his left hand is a shepherd's crook, in his right hand a pomegranate. His head is crowned with a pine garland with fruits, bronze rays of the sun, and on his Phrygian cap is a crescent moon. It was discovered in 1867 at the Campus of the Magna Mater together with other statues. The objects seem to have been hidden there in late antiquity. A plaster cast of it sits in the apse of the Sanctuary of Attis at the Campus of the Magna Mater, while the original was moved to the Vatican Museums.

A marble bas-relief depicting Cybele in her chariot and Attis, from Magna Graecia, is in the archaeological museum in Venice. The pair also feature prominently on the silver Parabiago plate.

A finely executed silvery brass Attis that had been ritually consigned to the Moselle River was recovered during construction in 1963 and is kept at the Rheinisches Landesmuseum of Trier. It shows the typically Anatolian costume of the god: trousers fastened together down the front of the legs with toggles and the Phrygian cap.

In 2007, in the ruins of Herculaneum a wooden throne was discovered adorned with a relief of Attis beneath a sacred pine tree, gathering cones. Various finds suggest that the cult of Attis was popular in Herculaneum at the time of the eruption of Vesuvius in 79 CE.

Photo gallery

Notes

References

Further reading 

 

  [includes French language summary]
 Reviewed by

External links

 

 

 

 

Phrygian gods
Cybele
Life-death-rebirth gods
Agricultural gods
Castration
Nature gods
Metamorphoses into trees in Greek mythology